The 13th Politburo of the Communist Party of Vietnam (CPV), formally the 13th Political Bureau of the Central Committee of the Communist Party of Vietnam (Vietnamese: Bộ Chính trị Ban Chấp hành trung ương Đảng Cộng sản Việt Nam Khoá XIII), was elected at the 1st Plenary Session of the 13th Central Committee (CC) in the immediate aftermath of the 13th National Congress. Nguyễn Phú Trọng was re-elected for his third term as General Secretary of the Communist Party of Vietnam, a position he has held since 2011.

On 30 December 2022, at the 13th CC's 2nd Extraordinary Plenary Session, Phạm Bình Minh offered his resignation as a member of the 13th Politburo; the plenum approved the resignation, and he was removed from the 13th CC as well. Nguyễn Xuân Phúc, the President of Vietnam and the second-ranked member of the 13th Politburo, voluntarily resigned from all state and party offices at the 3rd Extraordinary Plenary Session on 17 January 2023.

Members

References

Bibliography

13th Politburo of the Communist Party of Vietnam